The 1984 Japan Series was the 35th edition of Nippon Professional Baseball's postseason championship series.  It matched the Central League champion Hiroshima Toyo Carp against the Pacific League champion Hankyu Braves. This was the fourth Japan Series appearance for the Carp, and the tenth appearance for the Braves. The Carp defeated the Braves in seven games to claim their third Japan Series championship.

Summary

See also
1984 World Series

References

Japan Series
Hiroshima Toyo Carp
Orix Buffaloes
Japan Series
Japan Series
Japan Series